East Columbia Historic District may refer to:

 East Columbia Historic District (Farmington, Missouri), listed on the NRHP in Missouri
 East Columbia Historic District (East Columbia, Texas), listed on the NRHP in Texas

See also
Columbia Historic District (disambiguation)